2021 UEC European Track Championships was the twelfth edition of the elite UEC European Track Championships in track cycling and took place at the Tissot Velodrome in Grenchen, Switzerland, from 5 to 9 October 2021. Originally it was supposed to be held in Minsk, Belarus, between 23 and 27 June 2021 as an elite UEC European Track Championships in track cycling On 27 May 2021 the Management Board of the European Cycling Union decided to cancel the 2021 Elite Track European Championships scheduled in Minsk in June 2021.

On 1 June, it was announced that the championships would go ahead in the second week of October 2021.

Belarus hosting controversy 
In March 2021 the Belarusian Sport Solidarity Foundation urged the European Cycling Union to relocate the event from Belarus on human rights grounds. The ECU replied that it was unable to find another suitable host. Earlier in the year, similar controversy regarding the proposed location of the 2021 IIHF World Championship in Belarus lead to it being moved from the country.

In May 2021 the National Olympic Committee and Sports Confederation of Denmark proposed to move the European Track Cycling Championship to Denmark due to safety issues and attitude towards COVID-19 in Belarus. Denmark is ready to consider the possibility of compensation for all losses of the European Cycling Union associated with the change of the venue.

On 25 May 2021 the German Cycling Federation informed the European Cycling Association that after the events with the forced grounding of Ryanair Flight 4978, it was not possible for the German team to come to Minsk under these circumstances. On 25 May the national track team of Netherlands also refused to go to Minsk. On 26 May the national track team of Lithuania announced about withdrawal from championships if it's going to be held in Minsk and proposed to move championships to Panevėžys in Lithuania.

Schedule

Events

 Competitors named in italics only participated in rounds prior to the final.
 These events are not contested in the Olympics.
 In the Olympics, these events are contested within the omnium only.

Medal table

References

External links
 Official website
 Results
 Results book

 
UEC European Track Championships
European Track Championships
2021 UEC
2021 UEC
October 2021 sports events in Switzerland
2021 in European sport
Grenchen